Hypomecis obliquisigna is a species of moth of the family Geometridae. It is found in Taiwan.

References

Moths described in 1912
Boarmiini
Moths of Taiwan